Bicas is a Brazilian municipality in the state of Minas Gerais.  its population is estimated to be 14,554 inhabitants.

History 

Initially a breakpoint for salesmen in the 18th century, Bicas obtained its independence from the city of Guarará in 1923. It was an attraction point for Italian immigrants and also other nationalities.

Until the 1970s, Bicas had a full-working train station and an active RFFSA (the extinct state railroad company) branch for repairing wagons. All this structure was dismantled and today the train station exists only as a historic site. Currently, Bicas has an economy based on commerce, agriculture and farming.

Annual Farming Expositions, with bull-riding and rodeos, cattle commerce and local products - typically in the last week of July of every year - are a tradition of several cities in Zona da Mata, and the Farming Exposition of Bicas is one of the most famous, attracting thousands of tourists from several parts of the country.

Notable people
Danilo Football player

Joselio Vieira (Oxford PhD in Physical Chemist) born September 1967. Inventor of first 100% cocoa fruit chocolate

Aerial photos

See also
List of municipalities in Minas Gerais

References

Municipalities in Minas Gerais